The Last Coupon is a 1932 British comedy film directed by Frank Launder and starring Leslie Fuller, Mary Jerrold and Molly Lamont. It was based on a play by Ernest Bryan and was a success at the box office. It was shot at the Elstree Studios of British International Pictures near London. The film's sets were designed by the art director Duncan Sutherland.

Plot summary
A coal miner believes he has won the football pools and radically alters his spending habits only to find he has forgotten to post his coupon.

Cast
 Leslie Fuller as Bill Carter
 Mary Jerrold as Polly Carter
 Molly Lamont as Betty Carter
 Binnie Barnes as Mrs Meredith
 Gus McNaughton as Lord Bedlington
 Jack Hobbs as Doctor Sinclair
 Harry Carr as Jocker
 Jimmy Godden as Geordie Bates
 Marian Dawson as Mrs Bates
 Hal Gordon as Rusty Walker

References

Bibliography
 Shafer, Stephen C. British popular films, 1929-1939: The Cinema of Reassurance. Routledge, 1997.
 Sutton, David R. A chorus of raspberries: British film comedy 1929-1939. University of Exeter Press, 2000.

External links

1932 comedy films
1932 films
Films shot at British International Pictures Studios
Films directed by Frank Launder
British comedy films
British black-and-white films
1930s English-language films
1930s British films